Sultan Syarif Abdurrahman Alkadrie or Syarif Abdul Rahman Al Qadri 23 October 1771 (12 Rajab 1185) – 28 February 1808 (2 Muharram 1223 H) was the founder and the first Sultan of Pontianak. He was born in 1729/1730 (1142 H), and was the son of Syarif Habib Husein bin Ahmad Al Qadri, an Arab preacher and propagator of Islamic teachings. His mother was Nyai Tua Utin Kabanat, daughter of Sultan Muhammad Muazzuddin of Matan.

Biography 
Three months after his father died in Mempawah, Syarif Abdurrahman together with his brothers agreed to find a new residence. They set off with 14 boats down the Peniti River. When it was time for Dhuhur prayer, they arrived at a headland, Syarif Abdurrahman and his followers settled there. The place is now known as Kelapa Tinngi Segedong. However, Abdurrahman felt that the place was not suitable to live in and decided to continue his journey upstream. While walking down the Kapuas River, they found an island which is now called Batu Layang, where Syarif Abdurrahman and his descendants are buried. On the island they got disturbed by the ghost of Pontianak or Kuntilanak. Syarif Abdurrahman then ordered all his followers to fight the ghosts. The group later continued their journey down the Kapuas River.

Towards the dawn of the 23rd of October 1771, they arrived at the junction of the Kapuas River and the Landak River. After eight days of cutting down trees on the island, Abdurrahman then built a house and a hall, and then the place was named Pontianak. In that place now stands the Jami Mosque and the Kadriyah Palace.

Finally, on the 31st of August 1778, attended by the Yang di-Pertuan Muda of Riau-Lingga, Raja of Mempawah, Raja of Landak, Raja of Kubu, and Sultan of Matan, Syarif Abdurrahman was crowned the Sultan of Pontianak with the title: Sultan Syarif Abdurrahman ibni Habib Husein Alkadrie. Under his leadership, the Sultanate developed as a port and trade city that was quite respected.

Reign 
At the beginning of his leadership, there was a conflict between Pontianak and the Landak Kingdom regarding a territorial dispute. The Landak Kingdom claimed that the territory occupied by the Pontianak Sultanate was its territory. The Dutch who saw this conflict used it to exert influence in Kalimantan. In late 1778, the Dutch sent their envoys to Pontianak to begin negotiations with Sultan Syarif Abdurrahman, but this failed. However, because the power of Banten, which controlled the conflict area, was getting weaker, its territory was finally transferred to the Dutch. The Dutch, eager to establish a representative office in Pontianak, sent envoys in mid-1779. Finally, an agreement was agreed with Sultan Syarif Abdurrahman, which stated that the Dutch would lend the Pontianak and Sanggau areas to the Sultan of Pontianak.

This event marked the start of Dutch rule in Pontianak, which later developed into a trade monopoly. After that, Pontianak was obliged to hand over all the commodities that the Dutch wanted. The planting of crops was also closely monitored by the Dutch. In addition, export and import taxes must be shared between the Netherlands and the Pontianak Sultanate. The Pontianak Sultanate also allowed the Dutch to build a fort west of the Kapuas River.

Death 
Sultan Syarif Abdurrahman Alkadrie died on a Friday evening, on 28 February 1808 (2 Muharram 1223 H). He was succeeded by his son, Sultan Syarif Kasim Alkadrie.

Lineage  
Syarif Abd al-Rahman Al Qadri was a Ba 'Alawi Sayyid and his lineage is recorded as follows: He is Abd al-Rahman bin Husayn, bin Ahmad, bin Husayn, bin Muhammad al-Qadri, bin Salim, bin Abd Allah, bin Muhammad, bin Salim, bin Ahmad, bin Abd al-Rahman, bin Ali, bin Muhammad Jamal al-Layl, bin Hasan, bin Muhammad Asad Allah, bin Hasan al-Turabi, bin Ali, bin Muhammad al-Faqih al-Muqaddam, bin Ali, bin Muhammad Sahib al-Mirbat, bin Ali Khali Qasam, bin Alawi al-Thani, bin Muhammad Sahib al-Sawma'ah, bin Alawi al-Awwal, bin Ubayd Allah, bin Ahmad al-Muhajir, bin Isa al-Rumi, bin Muhammad al-Naqib, bin Ali al-Uraydi, bin Ja'far al-Sadiq, bin Muhammad al-Baqir, bin Ali Zayn al-Abidin, bin Husayn, bin Ali bin Abi Talib and Fatimah al-Zahra, the daughter of Muhammad.

References 

1771 births
1808 deaths
People from West Kalimantan